Charles May Swift (1854-1929) was the American businessman who founded Meralco, the largest electric utility and one of the leading companies of the Philippines, founded as the Manila Electric Railroad and Light Company.  A lawyer from Detroit, Michigan, United States, Swift also founded the Philippine Railway Company Inc (now known as Panay Railways) and several other railroads in Michigan.

Swift was born in Middlebury, Vermont and moved to Detroit when he was still a child. He finished school, graduating from Detroit High School, in 1870, and was admitted to the bar in 1877. He made his fortune in mining. He practiced law until about 1893, after which he was involved with building and operating electric trams and steam railroads in Michigan and the Philippines, then a colony of the United States. Investments in trolleys and the Philippines were profitable for him.  Railroads in the Philippines and Michigan that he was involved with building include, in the Philippines, the Philippine Railway Company, the Manila Electric Railroad and Light Company and Manila Suburban Railways Company; and in Michigan, the Wyandotte and Detroit River Railway, the Rapid Railway, and the Detroit and Port Huron Shore Line Railway. He was also president and director of the Nepigon Mining Lands Company.

He married Clara Trowbridge in 1886 and later Jessica Stewart Sylvester in 1913.  He had no children. He lived for many years in Grosse Pointe, Michigan.

In 1929, he became ill and withdrew all his money from the stock market in order to set up family trusts.  He would die on June 21 before the Wall Street Crash of 1929, thus inadvertently saving his fortune from that financial disaster.  He is buried in Middlebury.

His papers are at the Henry Sheldon Museum of Vermont History in Middlebury, VT as part of the Stewart-Swift Research Center, along with papers and documents from his and his second wife's family.

He was a trustee of Middlebury College and bequeathed US$200,000 to the college, to be paid after his wife dies and the life trust for her benefit was dissolved.

He owned two vacation homes in Vermont, both of which still exist.  One on Lake Champlain in Ferrisburg, Vermont, he named Grosse Pointe after his hometown in Michigan.  The other in Middlebury is currently an inn known as the Swift House Inn.

See also
 John Wolcott Stewart

References

External links
 
 Our History, Swift House Inn, house formerly owned by Charles Swift

1854 births
1929 deaths
American railway entrepreneurs
People from Middlebury, Vermont
People from Grosse Pointe, Michigan
Businesspeople from Vermont
Businesspeople from Michigan
Rail transportation in the Philippines
Middlebury College